Hedwig Langecker (29 January 1894 – 31 January 1989) was a Bohemian, Czech, and German pharmacologist known for her discovery of the pharmacological properties of Polygonatum officinale and Polygonatum multiflorum. She was also known for her studies of steroid hormone biochemistry and her prolific output, which included over 200 scientific articles and several textbooks. Her career began at the German University in Prague, where she earned her M.D. in 1920 and a Ph.D. in 1923, and was habilitated in 1926; Langecker then became a professor and served in that role until 1945. That year, she moved to the Free University of Berlin, where she was a professor until 1959 and an emerita professor until her death in 1989.

References

Czech pharmacologists
German pharmacologists
Women biochemists
Women pharmacologists
German women scientists
Czech women scientists
1894 births
1989 deaths
20th-century women scientists